Luigi Farace (14 October 1934 – 30 November 2018) was an Italian politician, businessman, and a member the Christian Democrats of Italy. He served as the Mayor of Bari from 1978 until 1981. He was then elected to Chamber of Deputies for two terms during the X and XI legislatures from 1987 to 1994. 

Farace died in Bari on 30 November 2018 at the age of 84.

References

1934 births
2018 deaths
Mayors of Bari
Deputies of Legislature X of Italy
Deputies of Legislature XI of Italy
Christian Democracy (Italy) politicians
20th-century Italian politicians
21st-century Italian politicians
Italian corporate directors